Maui Gayme (born October 30, 1983 in Papeete) is an alpine skier who represented Chile at the 2002 Winter Olympics and at the 2006 Winter Olympics. He also represented Chile at the 2010 Winter Olympics. He finished 57th in the Downhill discipline at the 2010 Winter Olympics.

References 

Alpine skiers at the 2002 Winter Olympics
Alpine skiers at the 2006 Winter Olympics
Alpine skiers at the 2010 Winter Olympics
Olympic alpine skiers of Chile
Chilean male alpine skiers
People from Papeete
1983 births
Living people
21st-century Chilean people